Alexios Tzamplakon was a Byzantine aristocrat and high official.

Life 
The Tzamplakones were an important and wealthy aristocratic family attested since the mid-13th century, when one of its members achieved the high military rank of Domestic of the Schools. Alexios was this man's son. 

He is first attested in 1317, in the service of Emperor Andronikos II Palaiologos (r. 1282–1328). He is then mentioned in 1326, when he held the dignity of megas tzaousios and the post of governor (kephale) of the city of Serres and the region of Popolia south of Mount Pangaion in Macedonia. In the civil war between Andronikos II and his grandson Andronikos III (r. 1328–1341), Tzamplakon initially sided with the elder Andronikos, but in 1327 changed sides, and was rewarded with a promotion to megas papias and the governorship of Zichne.

In July 1331/1332, Tzamplakon commanded the Byzantine army's left wing in the defeat at Rhosokastron against the Bulgarians. In November 1332, in his last known act as megas papias, he co-signed a treaty with Venice. Shortly thereafter, and having already some time before adopted the monastic name Antony, he retired to a monastery where he lived out his days. The date of his death is unknown, but was probably after 1334.

Family 
Alexios Tzamplakon had four known children, three sons and a daughter:
 Asomatianos, who became megas doux (commander of the Byzantine navy)
 Arsenios, who also became a megas papias
 Demetrios, who became megas stratopedarches (a senior military rank)
 an unnamed daughter, who married a member of the Tornikes family

References

Sources
 
 
 

13th-century births
14th-century deaths
14th-century Byzantine people
Byzantine officials
Byzantine governors
Eastern Orthodox monks
Alexios